Ranveer is a given name. Notable people with the name include:

Ranveer Brar (born 1978), Indian celebrity chef, TV show judge, and food stylist
Ranveer Jamwal (born 1975), Indian army officer and mountaineer
Ranveer Singh (born 1985), Indian actor in Hindi films

Indian given names